Víctor Andrés Córdoba Córdoba (born November 8, 1987) is a Colombian  footballer who since 2014 has played midfielder for Bolívar.

In his career Córdoba has played for three clubs in three leagues. The clubs he has played for are Once Caldas, Real Cartagena and his current club Bolívar.

Club career statistics

References

External links

1987 births
Living people
Colombian footballers
Footballers from Medellín
Once Caldas footballers
Real Cartagena footballers
Club Bolívar players
FC Juárez footballers
Deportivo Táchira F.C. players
Alianza Petrolera players
Leones F.C. footballers
A.C. Marinhense players
U.D. Leiria players
Colombian expatriate footballers
Expatriate footballers in Bolivia
Colombian expatriate sportspeople in Bolivia
Expatriate footballers in Mexico
Colombian expatriate sportspeople in Mexico
Expatriate footballers in Venezuela
Colombian expatriate sportspeople in Venezuela
Expatriate footballers in Portugal
Colombian expatriate sportspeople in Portugal
Association football midfielders